Günter Dohrow (15 August 1927 – 27 June 2008) was a German middle-distance runner. He competed in the men's 800 metres at the 1956 Summer Olympics.

References

1927 births
2008 deaths
Athletes (track and field) at the 1952 Summer Olympics
Athletes (track and field) at the 1956 Summer Olympics
German male middle-distance runners
Olympic athletes of Germany
Olympic athletes of the United Team of Germany
Place of birth missing